Zacharias III (c. 822c. 854) was ruler of the Nubian kingdom of Makuria. In 833, he ceased paying the Baqt to the rulers of Egypt, and prepared to fight the Abbasid Caliph al-Mu'tasim (833-842) over the tribute. He sent his son Georgios (Arabic: Firaki) to renegotiate the terms, and al-Mu'tasim reduced the payment to once every third year.

When the Beja refused to pay their tribute to the Abbasids in 854, the forces of Makuria joined with them in attacking Egypt. They slew the Egyptians working the emerald mines in the Eastern Desert, invaded Upper Egypt and pillaged Edfu, Esna and many other villages.1

References
E.A. Wallis Budge, A History of Ethiopia: Nubia and Abyssinia, 1928 (Oosterhout, the Netherlands: Anthropological Publications, 1970), p. 104.

Nubian people
Kingdom of Makuria
9th-century monarchs in Africa
9th-century births
Year of birth uncertain
Year of death unknown